Paul Brest (born  1940) is an American scholar of constitutional law, a former president of the William and Flora Hewlett Foundation, and a former dean of Stanford Law School. He is an influential theorist on the role of non-profit organizations in society, and is widely credited with coining the name originalism to describe a particular approach to interpreting the United States Constitution.

Education and early career
Brest received his Bachelor of Arts degree from Swarthmore College in 1962 and his Bachelor of Laws from Harvard Law School in 1965.

Following law school, Brest clerked for Judge Bailey Aldrich of the Court of Appeals for the First Circuit and for Justice John Marshall Harlan II of the Supreme Court of the United States. He also practiced as a civil rights litigator with the NAACP Legal Defense and Education Fund in Mississippi.

Academic career
In 1969, Brest joined the faculty of Stanford Law School, serving as Dean of the law school from 1987 until 1999, when he voluntarily stepped down to become president of the William and Flora Hewlett Foundation. His scholarship focuses on constitutional law and judgment and decision-making in law, and he is the author of the leading casebook, Processes of Constitutional Decision-Making.

Brest returned to Stanford Law School in 2012 and continues to teach courses on philanthropy, decision-making, and impact investing. He also directs numerous policy practicums through the Stanford Law and Policy Lab.

Between 1983 and 1984, Brest served as a fellow of the Center for Advanced Study in the Behavioral Sciences; he is now the Chairman of the Board of Directors. Brest is also the faculty co-director of the Stanford Center on Philanthropy and Civil Society, and he serves as a lecturer at the Stanford Graduate School of Business.

Brest is an elected fellow of the American Academy of Arts and Sciences. He is one of the 50 most-cited legal scholars of all-time and has published two of the 100 most-cited law review articles of all-time. Brest holds honorary degrees from Northwestern University School of Law and Swarthmore College. He served on the Creative Commons board of directors including time spent as its chair.

Works

Paul Brest, Sanford Levinson, J.M. Balkin and Akhil Reed Amar, Reva B. Siegel, Processes of Constitutional Decision-Making, New York: Aspen, 5th ed., 2010 Supplement, 2010.
Paul Brest and Linda Hamilton Krieger, Problem Solving, Decision Making, and Professional Judgment: A Guide for Lawyers and Policymakers, Oxford: Oxford University Press, 2010.
Paul Brest and George Lowenstein, In Defense of Fear, Pittsburgh Post-Gazette, July 12, 2009, pg. B1.
Paul Brest and Hal Harvey, Dealing with Hard Times: Advice for Foundations, Chronicle of Philanthropy, November 13, 2008.
Paul Brest and Hal Harvey, Money Well Spent: A Strategic Plan for Smart Philanthropy, New York: Bloomberg Press, October 2008.
Paul Brest, California's Diversity Legislation is Misguided, The Chronicle of Philanthropy, March 6, 2008.
Paul Brest, Sanford Levinson, J.M. Balkin and Akhil Reed Amar, Processes of Constitutional Decision-Making, New York: Aspen, 5th ed., 2007 Supplement, 2007.
Paul Brest, Sanford Levinson, J.M. Balkin, Akhil Reed Amar and Reva B. Siegel, Processes of Constitutional Decisionmaking: Cases and Materials, New York: Aspen Publishers, 5th ed., 2006.
Paul Brest, Preface: How This Symposium Came About, 97 Northwestern University Law Review 1079-1080 (Spring 2003).
Paul Brest, Some Comments on Grutter v. Bollinger, 51 Drake Law Review 683-696 (2003).

See also 
 List of law clerks of the Supreme Court of the United States (Seat 9)

References

External links
 

1940s births
Living people
American university and college faculty deans
Members of the Creative Commons board of directors
Harvard Law School alumni
Law clerks of the Supreme Court of the United States
Swarthmore College alumni
Deans of Stanford Law School